Pierre Calle (born 1 June 1889, date of death unknown) was a Belgian fencer. He competed in the team sabre event at the 1920 Summer Olympics.

References

1889 births
Year of death missing
Belgian male fencers
Belgian sabre fencers
Olympic fencers of Belgium
Fencers at the 1920 Summer Olympics